Okashina Okashi – Strange Candy is a webcomic hosted on Comic Genesis, a free hosting provider for webcomics. It is drawn by Emily Snodgrass (Emi-chan) and written by Allison Brownlow (Tanzy), Karen Olympia (Kourin), and J. Baird (Xuanwu). It was started in 2001, with Brownlow as its first writer and Olympia added to the team in October 2001. Baird became the primary author in 2004. The comic celebrated its 1000th strip on April 11, 2013. The comic concluded on July 26, 2018, with a final pin-up on August 2.

Okashina Okashi is considered one of the  three most important comics in the fields of education and public health — alongside Penny Arcade and Dinosaur Comics — for facilitating the development of art-based research methods and a variety of educational projects. Baird frequently uses the comics in his volunteer teaching exercises. This involvement began when Baird used the comic as part of his classroom exercises while teaching for Hess Educational Organization, an English education provider in the Republic of China and Singapore. Similarly, he used the comic again when he volunteered to teach the Create a Comic Project, a free after-school youth literacy library activity in New Haven, Connecticut. This work has garnered praise from Secretary of Education Arne Duncan and Pearson CEO Marjorie Scardino.

Both Snodgrass and Baird have appeared at conventions speaking at amateur artist panels and manga in education panels. Snodgrass is an amateur artist who does not make a living from her online strip.

In August 2007, Snodgrass branched out with a spin-off comic set in the Beauty Man Garden, a fictional chain of restaurants in Okashina Okashi. The comic was called Mini BMG. This attempt at another comic "fizzled pretty quickly" but Snodgrass hopes to relaunch it someday, hoping "to plan better and have more comics done."

Plot

A group of strangers are sucked into the alternate universe of UberTokyo. They must try to find a way home by using plotholes to teleport between dimensional realms. Each realm is stated by characters to be a parody of a given genre of anime/manga or video games, such as sports, sentai, fantasy, and horror.

The comic archives are split into several distinct story arcs, called "Lands," each representing the world being visited in that arc. Known lands include:

 Amazon Land
 Shōjo Land
 Pr0n Land
 Space Drama Land
 Sports Land
 RPG Land
 Monster Bear Land
 Dream Land
 Mahou Shōjo Land

The lands are generally unrelated to each other, though some characters do appear in different lands (ex. a group of winged men from Space Drama Land playing as a Killer Croquet team in the Sports Land). Also, alternate universe versions of main characters, such as Yamichi and Minami, have appeared.

Recurring plot points in the series involve the Beauty Man Garden, a restaurant chain where all the waiters are bishounen and wear only extremely short aprons; a pair of cat boys, Spike and V, who monitor the group's progress from afar; and the schemes of Evil Overload Kerisu, the series' main antagonist, who wants the female main characters to serve as his groupies.

Characters

The cast consists of several groups of recurring members. The primary focus are the "Adventurers," who travel from land to land, as well as several recurring supporting cast members.

Ellie James, aka Eri-chan - One of the main characters of the comic, Eri-chan is 16 years old and from a high school in America. she came to Japan for a semester to study abroad, living with Keiko. She is well versed in various anime and manga and often cites examples or metaphors from obscure shows and books. Her favorite part of anime is pretty boys (aka bishounen), making her a natural fan of the Beauty Man Garden. Her nickname, Eri-chan, was given to her by Keiko. First appearance: OO #1.
Keiko Hasegawa - Keiko is one of the main characters of the comic. She first met Eri-chan when the latter came to Japan to study abroad. Unlike the others, she rarely expresses enjoyment when finding herself in a new world and considers the traveling "a bother." She also points out the silliness of some situations the cast faces. Her romance with Takeshi ended tragically and she has been verbally cold to him since. First appearance: OO #1.
Petra - Petra is the most violent member of the group and (appropriately) has access to hammer space and its myriad weapons. She seems to have formed a friendship with Lycidia and had a definite platonic relationship with Lymaran, who shared her love of destruction. She has an aversion to pretty things, though she can be somewhat romantic, as she was a lover with Hammon. First appearance: OO #2.
Lycidia - Lycidia is the party's "evil genius." Her stated goal is to rule the world, using her substantial wealth and mastery of intrigue. Daisuke became her first loyal minion, though she continues to search for more resources to acquire. She frequently uses sarcasm and will insult others if they displease her. First appearance: OO #4.
Eeichi Shinohara - Eeichi is a very perverted male. A singer and songwriter before joining the group, he is proficient with the guitar and some other instruments. The cast has not reacted well to songs he writers himself, however. Eeichi has sought "relations" with whatever pretty people he encounters - with mixed results. He was most often see with Hoshiki, as they both shared similar interests. First appearance: OO #3.
Hoshiko Yamano, aka Ho-chan - The most perverted female in the comic. She can even contemplate situations that make Eeichi blush and is famous for compiling lists of various activities. She recently became queen of an entire galactic empire and used her power to promote skimpy clothes for pretty boys everywhere. It's been revealed she sees Eeichi as her ideal mate, valuing his stamina. First appearance: OO #3. First use of "Ho-chan": OO #54.
Daisuke Dohmoto - Daisuke, 17, is the mysterious nerdy-looking who first summons the main cast to UberTokyo. He did it in an effort to create his own harem. He wound up serving as Lycidia's loyal minion for a time, and is now Ho-chan's court Jester. Of his family, only his father has been introduced and it's been implied there is something more to him than first met the eye. First appearance: OO #5.
Takeshi Shirokane - Takeshi was (is?) Keiko's cross-dressing boyfriend. A star of the kendo team, he also moonlighted as a female pop idol. He first met Keiko and the others in a shoujo-style high school where he was Keiko's boyfriend until he apparently betrayed her by not refuting rumors begun by his fiance, Himeko. He is hopelessly infatuated with Keiko and pursued her through the multiverse. He even proposed marriage to her, only to be harshly declined. He has since returned to Nade Nade High School. First appearance: OO #89.
Yamichi - Yamichi is the newest member of the main cast. Appearing briefly in Sports Land, he works for Professor Li as his assistant, testing the professor's gadgets such as the Plothole Generator that allows for travel between dimensions. He is also the lead guitarist for the boyband Kaze. In an encounter with Eri-chan, the GURPS Rifts (Plothole) Generator was damaged, which has caused Yamichi to wander the multiverse trying to get home. He finally re-appeared in the RPG Land and joined the others. Eri-chan has a strong dislike for him, which is actually a plot on her behalf to try to create a "love triangle" involving herself, Yamichi, and her true love, Ulrich. First appearance: OO #510.
Kerisu - Kerisu is series' primary antagonist. He is the evil overlord of UberTokyo and other areas. His dungeon lair has background music of "OOM OOM OOM" to reinforce his evilness. Among his minions are Tim, Dom, Ed, and his pet kitty Teneko. He also has an android named Minami, who he had built to replace his groupies (they went on strike). His goal, though he seems to have forgotten it, is to have the female cast of OO become his new groupies, as task he assigned Dom to perform. He is well versed in the "Advice for the Evil Overlord" list, so that he even has a five-year-old advisor. First appearance: OO #12.
Loyal Minion Tim - Tim is the number one minion of Kerisu and is always by the overlord's side. Sporting wings, a polo shirt, and khakis, Tim is on one hand possibly the sanest member of the cast and on the other hand possibly its most beset upon. He is often forced to do the dirty tasks Kerisu deems too low for himself, be it having androids built, picking up cards, or razing villages in an online game. He gets paid, but was not aware of it until Kerisu threatened to dock said income. First appearance: OO #24.
Dom & Ed - Based on Dominic Nguyen and Edmund Balan, both of whom have also made irregular appearances in Fred Gallagher’s webcomic Megatokyo, with Nguyen also ‘drawing’ (if that’s the word given the results) the infamous Shirt Guy Dom strips. Dom is one of Kerisu's minions. He has been tasked with hunting down the main cast to turn them into Kerisu's new groupies, but seems to have forgotten this goal and is instead simply shadowing the group from world to world. So far, his humiliations have included being made to cross dress, forced into jello wrestling, and turned into a sports mascot. He has a rivalry with Ed that involves heavy amounts of gunplay. First appearance: OO #12.
Teneko - Kerisu's pet cat(girl). She can transform between a cat and a catgirl at will, though her personality is much the same in both forms. Teneko is playful and curious, and rather ecchi. She loves Kerisu very much, and gets jealous if he gives other people attention. Teneko especially hates Minami, Kerisu's Fetish Android. First appearance (cat): OO #21 First appearance (catgirl): OO #189.
Minami - The first of a line of "Combat Bondage Elf Schoolgirl Android Maid with Glasses" robots that Ty creates for Lord Kerisu. She is meant to serve as a replacement for Kerisu's groupies that are on strike. She has multiple personalities, including an "Uber-Obsequious Slave Girl mode," "Fangirl mode," and "Rei mode." She's also very good at karaoke. Teneko hates her for stealing away the affections of Lord Kerisu. First appearance: OO #327.
Professor Li - The mad scientist of the comic. He is responsible for a number of things in the comic, the most significant appears to be some indirect involvement in the main cast first coming here. How he is involved in this is unknown. He was also caused the destruction of a sports stadium in the Sports Arc World and created the tentacle-summoning magical powers that Teneko used in an attempt to destroy Minami. First appearance: OO #514.

See also

 Megatokyo
 Create a Comic Project

References

External links
Okashina Okashi - Main site
Mini-BMG  - Main site of spin-off comic, Mini-BMG
OO on Comixpedia
Strange English #1

2000s webcomics
American comedy webcomics
Anime and manga inspired webcomics
Science fiction webcomics
LGBT-related webcomics
2001 webcomic debuts